Márcio José Ribeiro e Silva (born 12 March 1957), known as Márcio Ribeiro, is a Brazilian football coach and former player who played as an attacking midfielder. He is the current head coach of Audax.

Márcio Ribeiro spent his career mainly in charge of clubs in the São Paulo state before taking over Água Santa in 2013. With the club he achieved three consecutive promotions, and made his professional debut in 2016 Campeonato Paulista.

Márcio Ribeiro also had an unassuming spell at Portuguesa during the last months of 2016, suffering relegation to Série D. Back in 2005, he won the Campeonato Alagoano while in charge of CSA.

Honours

Club
CRB
Campeonato Alagoano: 1983

Manager
CSA
Campeonato Alagoano: 2005

Individual
Campeonato Alagoano top goalscorer: 1983

References

External links
Futebol de Goyaz profile 

1957 births
Living people
Footballers from São Paulo (state)
Brazilian footballers
Association football midfielders
Clube de Regatas Brasil players
Treze Futebol Clube players
Agremiação Sportiva Arapiraquense players
Brazilian football managers
Campeonato Brasileiro Série C managers
Esporte Clube Taubaté managers
Esporte Clube XV de Novembro (Piracicaba) managers
Barretos Esporte Clube managers
Associação Ferroviária de Esportes managers
Guaratinguetá Futebol managers
Centro Sportivo Alagoano managers
América Futebol Clube (SP) managers
União Recreativa dos Trabalhadores managers
União São João Esporte Clube managers
Botafogo Futebol Clube (SP) managers
Comercial Futebol Clube (Ribeirão Preto) managers
Associação Atlética Francana managers
Esporte Clube Água Santa managers
Associação Portuguesa de Desportos managers
Goianésia Esporte Clube managers
Anápolis Futebol Clube managers
Clube Atlético Linense managers
Sociedade Esportiva Matonense managers
Associação Desportiva São Caetano managers
Grêmio Osasco Audax Esporte Clube managers